Woodrow Wilson High School may refer to:

Schools currently named Woodrow Wilson High School
Woodrow Wilson Classical High School, Long Beach, California
Woodrow Wilson High School (Beckley, West Virginia)
Woodrow Wilson High School (Camden, New Jersey): Actively being renamed
Woodrow Wilson High School (Dallas, Texas)
Woodrow Wilson High School (Los Angeles)
Woodrow Wilson High School (Spring Township, Pennsylvania)
Woodrow Wilson High School (Youngstown, Ohio)

Schools formerly named Woodrow Wilson High School
August Martin High School, Jamaica, Queens: Reconfigured in 1971
Dakota High School (Fargo, North Dakota): Renamed in 2021
Harry S Truman High School (Levittown, Pennsylvania): Renamed in 1980
Ida B. Wells-Barnett High School, Portland, Oregon: Renamed in 2021
Manor High School (Portsmouth, Virginia): Renamed in 2021
Silas High School, Tacoma, Washington: Renamed in 2021
Woodrow Wilson High School (Middletown, Connecticut): Closed in 1958
Woodrow Wilson High School (San Francisco): Closed in 1996
Jackson-Reed High School, Washington, D.C. Renamed in 2022.

See also
Wilson School (disambiguation)
Wilson High School (disambiguation)
Woodrow Wilson Junior High School (disambiguation)

Woodrow Wilson